Hetland is a Norwegian surname. There are also people with this surname in North America. People with this surname can often trace their ancestry to an area in Norway called Hetland.

Notable people
 Aleksander Hetland (born 1982), a Norwegian swimmer 
 Audun Hetland (1920–1998), a Norwegian illustrator
 David J. Hetland (1947–2006), an American artist from Fargo, North Dakota
 James L. Hetland Jr. (1926–2012), an American politician from Minnesota
 Joseph Ingolph Hetland (1896–1982), a Canadian politician from Saskatchewan
Katie Hetland, a Norwegian film and television editor and director
 Tom Hetland (born 1954), a Norwegian journalist and editor
 Tor Arne Hetland (born 1974), a professional Norwegian cross-country skier
 Toril Hetland Akerhaugen (born 1982), a Norwegian footballer